Salvador "Salva" Reina (born 9 April 1978) is a Spanish actor and stand-up comedian, often referred to in the industry by the nickname 'Chuki'. He became known for performances in television series such as Allí abajo and Sabuesos or the film Marshland.

Biography 
Born in Las Palmas de Gran Canaria in 1978, he was raised in Málaga. He studied a degree in Sport Sciences in Granada. He landed his debut in a feature film with a role in Enrique García's 321 Days in Michigan, playing an inmate. He was cast afterwards for the Alberto Rodríguez's film Marshland in the role of Jesús, which advanced his career.

In 2021, he was awarded the Huelva Film Festival's Premio Luz, which recognised his whole career, mainly in the scope of comedy, both in television and film.

Filmography 

Television

Film

Accolades

Informational notes

References 

1978 births
21st-century Spanish male actors
Spanish male television actors
Spanish male film actors
Male actors from Andalusia
Living people